Ashakhet was a High Priest of Ptah during the beginning 21st Dynasty.

Ashakhet is known from the Genealogy of Ankhefensekhmet, where he is said to be a contemporary of Pharaoh Amenemnisu.

Ashaket was the father of the High Priest of Ptah Pipi A and the grand father of the High Priest of Ptah Harsiese.

References

Publications Regarding Berlin 23673 
 L Borchardt, Die Mittel zur Zeitlichen Festlegung von Punkten de Aegyptischen Geschichte und ihre Anwendung, 1935, pg 96-112
 Kees, Zeitschrift fur Agyptischer Sprache, 87 (1962), 146-9 (includes discussion of Louvre 96)

Memphis High Priests of Ptah
People of the Twenty-first Dynasty of Egypt